Robert McCormick (1864–unknown) was a Scottish footballer, who played for Stoke in the Football League.

Career
McCormick started playing for Scottish club Abercorn and he helped them win the 1886 Scottish Cup. In 1889 he moved down to England to play for Stoke. McCormick played in 12 league matches and scored twice during the 1889–90 season before returning to Abercorn.

McCormick played for Scotland once, scoring in a 4–1 win against Wales in April 1886.

Career statistics

Club

International
Source:

References

Sources

Scottish footballers
Scotland international footballers
Stoke City F.C. players
English Football League players
1864 births
Year of death missing
Abercorn F.C. players
Association football wingers
Footballers from Paisley, Renfrewshire
Place of death missing